Pouliquen is a surname. Notable people with the surname include:

 Yves Pouliquen (1931–2020), French ophthalmologist
 Yvon Pouliquen (born 1962), French footballer and manager

See also
 Poliquin

Breton-language surnames